Aix was an unincorporated rural village in Union Township, Jasper County, Indiana.

History
A post office was established at Aix in 1892, and remained in operation until it was discontinued in 1909. The community was likely named after Aix-en-Provence, in France.  A veterinary service, a church and two houses remain in the area.

Geography

References 

Unincorporated communities in Jasper County, Indiana
Unincorporated communities in Indiana